Injakkadan Mathai & Sons is a 1993 Malayalam film written by Kaloor Dennis and directed by Anil Babu, starring Innocent, Suresh Gopi, Jagadish, and Urvashi.

Plot
Injakkadan Mathai (Innocent) owns a textile shop called Injakkadan Mathai & Sons with his two sons Thankachan (Suresh Gopi) and Roy (Jagadish). Their main rival is the Chungathara clan, who also own a textile shop. Thankachan marries Beena (Saranya Ponvannan), who was the daughter of Mathai's friend, Thomachen. Roy falls in love with Sherly (Urvashi), Beena's sister. However they learn that Chungathara Chackochen had killed Thomachen. Inchakkadan Mathai was kidnapped by Chackochen and gets saved by his two sons.

Cast
Innocent ...  Injakkadan Mathai (Thankachan and Roy's father)
Suresh Gopi ...  Thankachan (Mathai's first son)
Jagadish ...  Roy (Mathai's second son)
Saranya Ponvannan ...  Beena (Thankachan's wife)
Urvashi  ...  Sherly (Roy's love interest)
K.P.A.C. Lalitha ...  Alikutty (Roy and Thankachan's mother)
Kalpana ...  Annakutty (Mathai's maid)
Rajan P. Dev ...  David
Sai Kumar
Jose Pellissery ...  Kuriachan
Adoor Bhavani ... Thandamma
Kundara Johny
Sukumari
Bobby Kottarakkara
 Aboobacker as Brockar Mathachan

Soundtrack 
The film's soundtrack contains 3 songs, all composed by S. P. Venkatesh and Lyrics by Bichu Thirumala.

References

External links
 

1990s Malayalam-language films
1993 comedy films
1993 films